Michael Benjamin Helter Rampton (born 31 May 1953) is a British linguist.

Career
Rampton completed a bachelor's degree at the University of York in 1976, and obtained a doctorate at the University of London in 1987. He was elected a fellow of the Academy of Social Sciences and the Royal Anthropological Institute.

Books

References

1953 births
Living people
Linguists of English
Linguists from the United Kingdom
Academics of King's College London
Alumni of the University of London
Alumni of the University of York
20th-century British male writers
21st-century British male writers
Fellows of the Academy of Social Sciences
Fellows of the Royal Anthropological Institute of Great Britain and Ireland